The All American is a 1932 American pre-Code sports drama film directed by Russell Mack and written by Ferdinand Reyher and Frank Wead. The film stars Richard Arlen, Andy Devine and Gloria Stuart. It was given its premiere in Los Angeles on October 7, 1932, by Universal Pictures. Many noted real-life football players and a coach appeared uncredited in the film.

Plot
College football hero Gary King's life changes for the worse when the allure of money results in a business arrangement with untrustworthy Willie Walsh and a romance with heiress Gloria Neuchard, changing all his previous plans.

Gary spurns sweetheart Ellen Steffens and puts off a promise to best friend Steve Kelly to launch a construction business together. His lavish spending on Gloria and gambling habit result in Gary falling deeply in debt.

In the meantime, Gary's younger brother Bob has become an All-American football star. Bob is married to Betty Poe and all is well until wealthy Gloria and scheming Willie turn up again. When a football game is scheduled between Bob's school and a team of older All-Stars, an opportunity arises for Gary to play against his brother and teach him not to make the same mistakes he did.

Cast 

Richard Arlen as Gary King
Andy Devine as Andy Moran
Gloria Stuart as Ellen Steffens
James Gleason as Chick Knipe
John Darrow as Bob King
Preston Foster as Steve Kelly
June Clyde as Betty Poe
Merna Kennedy as Gloria Neuchard
Harold Waldridge as Scheming Willie Walsh
Harvey Clark as Gresham McCormick
Huntley Gordon as Harcourt
Earl McCarthy as Ted Brown
Ethel Clayton as Mrs. Bowen
Margaret Lindsay as Miss Bowen
George Irving as Mr. King
Florence Roberts as Mrs. King
Frederick Burton as Mr. Neuchard
Karlton Kadell as Ken Neuchard
Manfred Vezie as Big Mike Allen
James Flavin as Don Lindsay
Earle Foxe as Read
Arthur Hoyt as Smythe
Fred Howard as radio announcer
Franklin Parker as radio announcer
Maurice Black as Blackie Doyle
Frank Hagney as Hop McComb
Reginald Barlow as bank president
Robert Ellis as Walter Grant
Miami Alvarez as Miss Wilson 
Rockliffe Fellowes as Gelt
Jack La Rue as Joe Fiore
Uncredited:
Marger Apsit as Football Player
Johnny Baker as Football Player
Walter Brennan as News Commentator at Game
Frank Carideo as Football Player
Jesse Hibbs as Football Player
Moon Mullins as Football Player
Ernie Nevers as Football Player
Erny Pinckert as Football Player
Lafayette Russell as Football Player
Gaius Shaver as Football Player
Pop Warner as Himself

Reception 
The New York Times critic gave it a mixed review, writing, "As a dramatic entertainment, it is not quite so satisfactory. ... The scenarists in 'The All American' are too strenuous in their zeal to show the perils of national publicity for the young collegiates who have a battle to fight with life when they leave college." The reviewer did praise the "outstanding performance" of Gleason and noted that "Mr. Arlen is earnest and attractive in the principal rôle."

References

External links 
 

1932 films
1930s sports drama films
American black-and-white films
American sports drama films
American football films
Films directed by Russell Mack
Universal Pictures films
1932 drama films
1930s English-language films
1930s American films
Films with screenplays by Richard Schayer